Local elections in Nicaragua were held on 6 November 2022. 153 mayors, vice mayors and municipal council members were elected. The Sandinista National Liberation Front won control of all municipalities.

References

See also 

 Politics of Nicaragua

Local elections in Nicaragua

2022 elections in Central America
2022 in Nicaragua
November 2022 events in North America
Elections in Nicaragua